Fady Nagah (born 9 May 1990) is an Egyptian football player who is currently plays for Al Mokawloon.

He formerly played for Haras El Hodoud SC, Petrojet FC and Smouha SC.

Career
On 28 February 2019, Nagah joined Mauerwerk Sport Admira in Austria.

References

External links

1990 births
Living people
Egyptian footballers
Egyptian Premier League players
Association football defenders
Al Mokawloon Al Arab SC players
ENPPI SC players
El Entag El Harby SC players
Smouha SC players
Petrojet SC players
Haras El Hodoud SC players